was a Japanese samurai lord and gōzoku in the Heian period. He was the head of the Taira clan in the early 11th century, and an ancestor of the Chiba clan. He served as Governor of Shimōsa and Vice-Governor of Kazusa Provinces, and managed the Ise Grand Shrine in fact if not in name.

In 1028, Tadatsune resigned from the office of Vice-Governor of Kazusa, and attacked Kazusa and Awa Provinces, seeking to expand his power base. The Imperial Court sought to stop him, and nominated Minamoto no Yorinobu, Governor of Ise Province, to lead the attack; he refused. The Court then appointed Taira no Naokata and Nakahara Narimichi, who were recalled soon afterwards, after making no progress.

The Governor of Awa Province fled to Kyoto in 1030, and the following year, Minamoto no Yorinobu rose to the occasion, after being appointed Governor of Kai Province. Knowing he could not defeat Yorinobu, Tadatsune surrendered without a fight, and was taken prisoner, perishing on the way to the capital.

See also

References

Sansom, George (1958). 'A History of Japan to 1334'. Stanford, California: Stanford University Press.

1031 deaths
Taira clan
People from Chiba Prefecture
Year of birth unknown